Diacylglycerol kinase (CTP dependent) (DAG kinase, CTP-dependent diacylglycerol kinase, diglyceride kinase) is an enzyme with systematic name CTP:1,2-diacyl-sn-glycerol 3-phosphotransferase. This enzyme catalyses the following chemical reaction

 CTP + 1,2-diacyl-sn-glycerol  CDP + 1,2-diacyl-sn-glycerol 3-phosphate

This enzyme requires Ca2+ or Mg2+ for activity.

See also 
 Diacylglycerol kinase

References

External links 
 

EC 2.7.1